Stagecoach Gold bus route X4 is a bus route in England that links Northampton and Peterborough via Wellingborough, Kettering and Corby. This service is operated by the Stagecoach Midlands bus company.

Route

This route was launched on May 28, 2000 as a Stagecoach Express service between Northampton and Peterborough. In April 2004, the route extended from Northampton through to Milton Keynes. Over the years, the X4 route has linked the main towns of the county of Northamptonshire with Milton Keynes and Peterborough enabling better east-west county public transport links than has previously been possible. From end to end, the average journey time is 3 hours and 30 minutes and the distance approximately 70 miles (110 km)

In May 2018, the service runs between Northampton and Peterborough only. Initially Stagecoach X7 ran between Northampton and Milton Keynes instead (as well as to and from Leicester), but this was also cut back leaving the X6 as the main link between the two towns.

The X4 inter-urban bus service benefited from £4.4 million ODPM Growth Area Funding between 2003 and 2006 and has seen annual passenger numbers rise from 325,000 in 2003/04 to over 500,000 in 2004/05.

Current route
 Northampton North Gate bus station
 Cliftonville for Northampton General Hospital
 Earls Barton Square
 Wellingborough Church St
 Isham Monk & Minstrel public house
 Kettering Horse Market
 Corby George Street for Willow Place Shopping Centre
 Corby railway station 
 Corby Village The Jamb
Corby Business Academy (Certain journeys start/terminate here)
 Weldon
 Upper Benefield
 Lower Benefield
 Oundle Market Place
 Elton Black Horse (evenings and Sundays)
 Alwalton Lay-by (evenings and Sundays)
 Warmington 
 Peterborough railway station  (certain journeys)
 Peterborough Queensgate bus station

Service

The service runs seven days a week. Monday to Saturday daytimes, there is a half-hourly service between Northampton and Peterborough.

Evenings and Sundays there generally is a two-hourly service between Northampton and Peterborough and a two-hourly service between Northampton and Corby. An hourly frequency on the core part of the route between Northampton and Corby.

To comply with drivers’ hours regulations, the route has registered in two parts between, Northampton & Corby and Corby & Peterborough.

Vehicles

In November 2011, this route became a Stagecoach Gold branded one with Stagecoach Midlands spending £1.9 million on a fleet of 13 new Scania ADL Enviro400 buses based at the Kettering depot, halfway along the route.

These buses have Lazzerini leather seats and free wireless internet 

As of October 2018 the fleet is being replaced by 13 Enviro 400MMC buses by Alexander Denis at a cost of £3.1million

References

External links

Bus routes in England
Coach routes in England
Stagecoach Group
Transport in Northamptonshire